Noel Webb is an American rock/jazz violinist, musical score composer, actor, and voice-over artist. He is also considered one of the first American rock violinists and electric violinists.

Noel has performed both as a solo jazz violinist and as a symphony violinist. His notoriety initially came as he performed with the Boston Youth Symphony orchestra at age 14. His latest pop/rock LP album, My Love, was released in 2019. He recently experimented with rock/country on "I Followed," a single release.

He was a star of several films and movies of the week including The Alamo, Young Riders, The Menendez Brothers and Reluctant Agent, was featured on commercials by McDonald's, Honda, Emery, NBC Promo, a CBS Promo, and narrated many A&E Biographies, TNN Biographies, and movie trailers.

As a composer Webb has written film scores for several movies, television shows, trailers, and commercials including trailers for A History of Violence, The Butterfly Effect, 2 Fast 2 Furious, Seabiscuit, Ray, Storm in the Afternoon, and The Crow.

Discography
 My Love (2019)
I Followed (2019)
Journey With Me (2012)
Give It All (2009)
The Big Bang (2007)
The Soul Of (2003)
Satin Sheets (2000)
 Storm Dance (1996)

References

External links
 Artist's website

1940s births
Living people
American film score composers
American male film score composers
American jazz musicians
American male television actors
American male violinists
21st-century American violinists
21st-century American male musicians
American male jazz musicians